"God Told Me To" is the first single from Australian songwriter Paul Kelly's album Stolen Apples.

The song deals with a fictional character called John Johanna, on trial for murder. To explain his actions, John defends himself by saying that God told him to do this. The song features biblical imagery.

Video
The video for the song was first aired on ABC music video show Rage in June 2007. The video was directed by Natasha Pinkus, and was filmed in a single shot.

The video was nominated for a Dendy award at the 2007 Sydney Film Festival and won the 2007 Inside Film Award for 'Best Music Video'.

Personnel
Credits:
 Paul Kelly - acoustic guitar, lead vocals
 Dan Kelly - electric guitar, banjo, vocals
 Dan Ludscombe - electric guitar, keyboards, vocals
 Peter Ludscombe - drums, percussion
 Bill McDonald - bass

References

2007 singles
Paul Kelly (Australian musician) songs
2007 songs
Songs written by Paul Kelly (Australian musician)
EMI Records singles